Discovery Civilization or Discovery Civilisation may refer to:
Discovery Civilization (Latin America), a Latin American channel
Discovery History, a UK television channel formerly known as Discovery Civilisation from 1999 to 2007
Discovery Science (Canada), formerly known as Discovery Civilization Channel from 2001 to 2010
Discovery World (TV channel), a European television channel known as Discovery Civilisation from 1999 to 2008
Investigation Discovery, a U.S. cable television network known as Discovery Civilization from 1999 to 2003